Rebecca Odes (born September 11, 1969) is an American media entrepreneur, author, and former musician. From 1987 to 1992, she was the bassist and vocalist for the band Love Child. In 1994, she debuted as a solo artist under the stage name Odes with the song "Meltaway", later releasing the extended play Me and My Big Mouth (1996).

Odes is the co-founder and creative director of the now-defunct website Gurl.com. She was awarded a New York Magazine Award in 1997 in recognition of her work. She also co-authored three books based on content from Gurl.com, beginning with Deal With It! A Whole New Approach to Your Body, Brain, and Life as a gURL (1999). Following her work on Gurl.com, Odes co-wrote the book From the Hips: A Comprehensive, Open-Minded, Uncensored, Totally Honest Guide to Pregnancy, Birth and Becoming a Parent (2007). In 2013, she also co-founded Wifey.tv. In 2016, she was listed under Forbes Forty Over 40.

Early and personal life
Odes was born in West Orange, New Jersey in the United States, and she was childhood friends with Esther Drill; the two attended West Orange High School, where they both participated in the French club, Ski club and the Cauldron school newspaper. Odes attended Vassar College and graduated with a degree. After graduation, she worked for an indie music magazine in Boston, Massachusetts.

Odes attended the School of the Art Institute of Chicago to study painting, but she dropped out due to her activities with Love Child. After Love Child's disbandment, Odes worked as a painting and studio assistant, as well as a design assistant for a Christmas tree bow manufacturer. After learning how to use design programs on her computer, she later enrolled at the Interactive Telecommunications Program at New York University and graduated with a master's degree.

Odes married Craig Kanarick, the co-founder of Razorfish, on October 27, 2001, at the Angel Orensanz Center. The two had met in 1996 when Odes took an interaction design course that Kanarick was teaching at New York University. Odes and Kanarick have two children.

Career

Music career

At the end of her freshman year in Vassar College, Odes formed the band Love Child with two other students and was the band's bassist and vocalist. On June 20, 1994, Odes (under her last name only) released "Meltaway" as a 7-inch vinyl single through Merge Records, with "Honey Gets Hard" as its B-side. On February 20, 1996, Odes released her extended play, Me and My Big Mouth.

Writing career

As high school students, Odes and her childhood friend Esther Drill conceived the idea of curating their own magazine with alternative media after noticing that the teen magazines available to them did not properly address their concerns. While they were graduate students at the Interactive Telecommunications Program at New York University, they, along with fellow student Heather McDonald, decided to form a female-positive online space aimed at teenagers, as the Internet lacked communities for girls in the 1990s. Gurl.com was then created as Odes, Drill, and McDonald's Master's Thesis project. The website was launched in May 1996. Odes acted as the creative director of Gurl.com. She, along with Drill and McDonald, were given the New York Magazine Award in 1997 for their work on the website.

Throughout the years of working on Gurl.com, Odes, Drill, and McDonald released three books based on the content of their website through a partnership with Scholastic. The first book, Deal With It! A Whole New Approach to Your Body, Brain, and Life as a gURL, was released on September 1, 1999, becoming a national bestseller and selling 100,000 copies in the United States by January 2000. It was awarded the I.D. Magazine Award in the Graphics category in July 2000. The second book, The Looks Book: A Whole New Approach to Beauty, Body Image, and Style, was released on October 1, 2002. The final book, Where Do I Go from Here?: Getting a Life After High School, was released in 2004. Following her work on Gurl.com, Odes co-wrote the book From the Hips: A Comprehensive, Open-Minded, Uncensored, Totally Honest Guide to Pregnancy, Birth and Becoming a Parent with Ceridwen Morris, with the book releasing on May 1, 2007.

In 2013, Odes founded Wifey.tv with Joey Soloway, an Internet-based platform for women. In the same year, she was a co-contributor to the book Unscrolled with Sam Lipsyte in a segment titled "10 Commandments."

In 2016, Odes became the executive producer of the film The Skinny. She was also listed in Forbes Forty Over 40 in the same year. In 2018, Odes co-founded CherryPicks, a review aggregator website for female and non-binary content, with Miranda Bailey.

Discography

Extended plays

Singles

Publications

As author

As contributor

References

External link
 

1969 births
Living people
20th-century American bass guitarists
20th-century American women singers
20th-century American singers
American feminist writers
American women non-fiction writers
People from West Orange, New Jersey
Musicians from New York (state)
Tisch School of the Arts alumni
Writers from New Jersey
Writers from New York (state)
Vassar College alumni
West Orange High School (New Jersey) alumni